"What Do I Have to Do" is a song performed by Australian singer-songwriter Kylie Minogue from her third studio album, Rhythm of Love (1990). The song was written and produced by Stock, Aitken & Waterman. Originally, the song was planned to be released after the single "Better the Devil You Know", but instead "Step Back in Time" was released and this was released as the third single on 21 January 1991. The song received positive reviews from most music critics, who thought the song was an instant rave classic.

The song peaked at number eleven in her native Australia. The song did however peak at number six in the United Kingdom, becoming a success there. The song was also hit in France and The Netherlands.

The song has been performed on most of Minogue's concert tours, including her Rhythm of Love Tour, Let's Get to It Tour and Intimate and Live Tour. The song has also been performed at the Showgirl: The Greatest Hits Tour and the Homecoming Tour, and has been most recently been performed at her Aphrodite World Tour.

Background
There are three official promotional mixes of the song. The early, unreleased first version is synth orienated and has multilayered vocals. Much of the synth was omitted, and the drums, bass and vocals were toned down for the second album version. The third version, the 7" Mix, contains a newer drum track, multilayered vocals in the chorus and relies much less on the synthesizers than on the album version. This version of the song also contains samples from American comedian Sam Kinison, and was used for the music video. In the UK, a limited edition 7″ single came with postcards with shots from the video.

Originally, "What Do I Have To Do" was planned to be released as the follow-up single to "Better the Devil You Know", but was released as the third single off the album, and the track was remixed for single release. The 1999 biographical book Girl Next Door identified this track as Kylie's favourite to perform live.

The single artwork was photographed by Robert Erdmann.

Reception

Critical response
"What Do I Have To Do?" received positive reviews from many music critics. Jason Shawahn from About.com said the song, along with "Better the Devil You Know" and "Wouldn't Change a Thing", "are nothing if not pop masterpieces." He also labeled it as a "pop classic". Quentin Harrison from Albumism noted it as "luxuriant electro-pop", adding that Ian Curnow and Phil Harding "rework it into an appetizing, but accessible house ditty that emphasizes unity between the single's beat and Minogue's supple vocal." While reviewing Rhythm of Love, Chris True from AllMusic highlighted the song as an album standout. NME voted it as the thirtieth best track of 1991. Eleanor Levy from Record Mirror described it as "more mature, in a Hi-NRG, Bronski Beatish way." She added, "More straightforward rhythm than formula pop song, it fizzes predictably rather than sparkles but, like Kylie's ever-elongating fringe, will no doubt grow and grow." Caroline Sullivan from Smash Hits called it "supreme", and felt the song "sees a return to the reassuring old Kylie-sound". Jonathan Bernstein from Spin viewed it as a "knockout" pop single", that "mirrored her evolution from tomboy to dreamboat." While reviewing Ultimate Kylie, Mark Edwards from Stylus Magazine gave it a positive remark, saying that along with "Shocked" and "Give Me Just a Little More Time", they "were great songs and suddenly Kylie was a little bit cool."

Chart performance
"What Do I Have to Do" debuted at number twenty-seven on the Australian Singles Chart, until rising and peaking at number eleven, staying there for two consecutive weeks. The song then debuted at number ninety-nine on the Dutch Top 40, until peaking at number eighty-one for one week. The song then debuted and peaked at number fifty on the French Singles Chart.

Impact and legacy
English DJ and record producer Nicky Holloway chose "What Do I Have to Do" as one of his top 10 vinyl thrills in 1996, saying, "I've had so much fun with this over the years. You don't realise what you're dancing to until it's too late to stop! It's got a long intro so people are dancing away and don't realise that it's Kylie Minogue until they're sucked into it."

Music video

The accompanying music video for the song was directed by Dave Hogan. In relation to this video, Minogue is quoted as saying "how many Hollywood stars can you look like in three and a half minutes". Her younger sister Dannii Minogue also appears in the video. The music video begins with clips of the dance scene intercut with Minogue's emerging from a swimming pool and her love interest seeing her with another man. The love interest is played by Zane O'Donnell, the same model who would appear in the video for Minogue's subsequent single "Shocked".

Minogue then goes out to the balcony overlooking a fairground and the man follows. The video then shifts to the man watching Minogue dancing with a female friend in a club. The next scene is Minogue waking up in her lover's bed as he prepares to leave the bedroom. After this, Minogue singing on the bed is intercut with scenes of her singing and dancing in front of a white backdrop. The video goes back to her and her friend having fun in the club as the man stares at her again. Later, she sits on the bench overlooking the scene and takes a glance at a lookalike of her lover next to her. Following this, she gets up to dance as the man watches. Finally, she gets a tattoo of a black panther on her back and shows it to her lover. The video concludes with all of Minogue's performance scenes intercut with her doing the ironing in an apron and on a date with her lover. The final shot is of Minogue and her lover who are walking across a bridge.

The video received heavy rotation on MTV Europe. While reviewing the DVD version of Greatest Hits, John Galilee said "Her most outrageous but greatest video moment is where she parodies certain movie stars in the chic video for "What Do I Have to Do?", and because of her heavy eye make-up almost earns herself the title drag-queen Kylie (watch out for sister Dannii who briefly stars in the video, wearing a blonde wig)."

Formats and track listings
These are the formats and track listings of major single releases of "What Do I Have to Do".

 7" vinyl single
 "What Do I Have to Do" (7" Mix) – 3:32
 "What Do I Have to Do" (Instrumental) – 3:48

 12" vinyl single
 "What Do I Have to Do" (Pumpin' Mix) – 7:48
 "What Do I Have to Do" (Extended Instrumental) – 5:08

 CD single
 "What Do I Have to Do" (7" Mix) – 3:32
 "What Do I Have to Do" (Pumpin' Mix) – 7:48
 "What Do I Have to Do" (Extended Instrumental) – 5:08

 iTunes Digital EP – Remixes
(Not available at time of original release. Released for the first time as part of iTunes PWL archive release in 2009)
 "What Do I Have to Do" (12" Instrumental)
 "What Do I Have to Do" (7" Mix)
 "What Do I Have to Do" (7" Backing Track)
 "What Do I Have to Do" (7" Instrumental)
 "What Do I Have to Do" (Album Backing Track)
 "What Do I Have to Do" (Album Instrumental)
 "What Do I Have to Do" (Between the Sheets Mix)
 "What Do I Have to Do" (Extended Album Mix)
 "What Do I Have to Do" (Movers & Shakers 12" Backing Track)
 "What Do I Have to Do" (Movers & Shakers 12" Instrumental)
 "What Do I Have to Do" (Movers & Shakers 7" Backing Track)
 "What Do I Have to Do" (Movers & Shakers 7" Instrumental)
 "What Do I Have to Do" (Movers & Shakers 7" Mix)
 "What Do I Have to Do" (Movers & Shakers 12" Mix)
 "What Do I Have to Do" (Movers & Shakers Do the Dub)
 "What Do I Have to Do" (Pumpin' Mix)

 iTunes Digital EP – The Original Synth Mixes (released 8 November 2010)
 "What Do I Have to Do" (Billy The Fish Mix: Part I) 3:44
 "What Do I Have to Do" (Billy The Fish Mix: Part II) 7:30
 "What Do I Have to Do" (Original 12" Mix) 7:09
 "What Do I Have to Do" (Extended Album Mix II) 8:42

 iTunes Digital EP – What Do I Have to Do?
 "What Do I Have to Do" (7" Mix) — 3:33
 "What Do I Have to Do" (Pumpin' Mix) — 7:47
 "What Do I Have to Do" (Extended Album Mix) — 8:07
 "What Do I Have to Do" (7" Instrumental) — 3:33
 "What Do I Have to Do" (Extended Instrumental) — 5:07
 "What Do I Have to Do" (7" Backing Track) — 3:33
 "What Do I Have to Do" (Album Instrumental) — 3:43
 "What Do I Have to Do" (Album Backing Track) — 3:43
 "Things Can Only Get Better" (Album Instrumental) — 3:55
 "Things Can Only Get Better" (Album Backing Track) — 3:55

Live performances
Minogue performed the song on the following concert tours:
 Rhythm of Love Tour
 Let's Get to It Tour
 Intimate and Live Tour
 On a Night Like This Tour
 Showgirl: The Greatest Hits Tour (as part of the "Smiley Kylie Medley")
 Showgirl: The Homecoming Tour (as part of the "Everything Taboo Medley")
 For You, for Me (as part of the "Everything Taboo Medley")
 Aphrodite World Tour
Summer 2019

The song was also performed on:
 An Audience with Kylie Minogue 2001 TV special, performed as part of the hits medley.

Charts

Weekly charts

Year-end charts

References

1991 singles
Kylie Minogue songs
Song recordings produced by Stock Aitken Waterman
Songs written by Mike Stock (musician)
Songs written by Matt Aitken
Songs written by Pete Waterman
1990 songs
Mushroom Records singles
Pete Waterman Entertainment singles
Torch songs
Eurodance songs